Wilków  is a village in Opole Lubelskie County, Lublin Voivodeship, in eastern Poland. It is the seat of the gmina (administrative district) called Gmina Wilków.

The village has a population of 208.

References

Villages in Opole Lubelskie County
Lublin Governorate
Lublin Voivodeship (1919–1939)